Henry Robert Tayler Alexander (26 October 1841 – 11 February 1920) was an English first-class cricketer. Alexander's batting and bowling styles are unknown. He was born at Brighton, Sussex.

Alexander was educated at Harrow School where he captained the school cricket team in 1861. Later that year he began his university studies at Trinity College, Cambridge. Two years later he made a single appearance in first-class cricket for Cambridge University against the Marylebone Cricket Club (MCC) at Fenner's. In a match which the MCC won by an innings and 6 runs, Alexander ended Cambridge University's first-innings not out without scoring, while in the MCC first-innings he took the wicket of Charles Lyttelton to finish with figures of 1/14 from five overs. He was last man out in Cambridge University's second-innings, scoring 3 runs before he was dismissed by George Wootton.

He later became a solicitor. He died at Westminster, London on 11 February 1920.

References

External links
Henry Alexander at ESPNcricinfo
Henry Alexander at CricketArchive

1841 births
1920 deaths
Sportspeople from Brighton
People educated at Harrow School
Alumni of Trinity College, Cambridge
English cricketers
Cambridge University cricketers
English solicitors